Tutta Bella Neapolitan Pizzeria is an Italian restaurant chain with six locations in Washington State. The first location was founded in 2004. The restaurant specializes in "authentic" Neapolitan pizza and is certified by the non-profit Associaziona Verace Pizza Napoletana ("True Neapolitan Pizza Association") which certifies pizzerias that use traditional ingredients and processes. Tutta Bella was the first restaurant in the Pacific Northwest to receive such certification.

Tutta Bella was founded by Joe Fugere with a location in Columbia City in January 2004. Since then, five other locations and a food truck have opened in Seattle and its suburbs. With the goal of creating a certified pizzeria, Fugere trained to become a pizzaiolo in Naples, Italy.

Menu

To maintain its certification by the Associaziona Verace Pizza Napoletana, Tutta Bella in required to follow preparation and cooking instructions for its pizzas. For example, specific types of ingredients are used in the pizza (fresh basil and herbs, fior di latte cheese), including a particular type of flour (tipo 00) and San Marzano tomatoes imported from Naples as well a specific type of oven (bell shaped, wood fired, with a 5-inch thick bottom).

The restaurant also sells appetizers and salads, Attibassi espresso, and Tiramisu from a family recipe.

Donations and recognition
Tutta Bella also engages in community donations, fundraising and outreach programs and has donated money to several local schools and organizations, often through partnerships with organizations like the Issaquah Food Bank and the Bellevue Schools Foundation.

Tutta Bella brought one of their wood-fired ovens to a local U.S. Air Force base for President Barack Obama's visit. The pizza, a special item called "Il Presidente", was eaten on Air Force One.

Locations
Columbia City, 4918 Rainier Avenue South, Seattle, WA 98118 (206) 721-3501
Stone Way, 4411 Stone Way N, Seattle, WA 98103 (206) 633-3800
Westlake, 2200 Westlake Ave, Seattle, WA 98121 (206) 624-4422
Crossroads, 15600 NE 8th St., Suite J1, Bellevue, WA 98008 (425) 502-7402
Issaquah, 715 NW Gilman Blvd, Issaquah, WA 98027 (425) 391-6838
Kirkland, 401 Park Place Center, Kirkland, WA 98033 (425) 822-2882

References

Italian restaurants in the United States
Restaurants in Seattle